Jennifer Valoppi is an American television journalist, producer and author known for her work on WTVJ.

Early life and education
Raised in Allen Park, Michigan, Valoppi graduated with a Bachelor of Arts degree in psychology from Oakland University, Michigan. Her mother was a singer.

Career
Valoppi began her career as a weather-caster and science editor for WEYI, the CBS affiliate in Flint, Michigan, in 1981 and was immediately named "Best Weathercaster".

From 1981 to 1984, Valoppi was an anchor and investigative reporter for NBC affiliate WPTV in West Palm Beach, where she won the United Press International's Award for "Best Investigative Work," for the series A Shot In The Dark, in which she helped free a man facing the electric chair.

From 1994 to 2005, Valoppi was a lead anchor a WTVJ in Miami. She was then news anchor at New York's WWOR-TV for 7 years.

Valoppi created and produced for WWOR two series of Money, Power and Influence, I and II, which was nominated for "Best New Syndicated Program," and won two New York Emmy Awards for "Best On-Air Talent" and "Best Entertainment Special."

who has been recognized on the floor of the United States Congress, and is a 2006 recipient of Florida Governor Jeb Bush's Points of Light Award.

Women of Tomorrow Mentor & Scholarship Program
Valoppi is founder and president of the Women of Tomorrow Mentor & Scholarship Program. Valoppi is directing its national expansion with the help of a grant of $3 million from the John S. & James L. Knight Foundation.

Personal life
Valoppi is married to Christian de Berdouare, the owner of the Chicken Kitchen restaurant chain. They met in 1994 after she had recently moved to the area to take the job at NBC 6.They got married in a small ceremony on Fisher Island in 1997. They have two sons, Julian and Jordan.

Filmography

Film

Television

Literature

Awards and honors
City of Miami Commission on the Status of Women 2004 Honorees 
Congressman Mario Diaz-Balart Honor Ms. Jennifer Valoppi on CapitolWords by the Sunlight Foundation
Finalist Diane Von Furstenberg's Most Iconic Women

References

External links
 
 Radio interview with Jennifer Valoppi WSLR by Doug Miles
Photo from her personal website
 
 

Living people
Television personalities from Detroit
American women journalists
People from Allen Park, Michigan
Oakland University alumni
Year of birth missing (living people)
21st-century American women